General elections were held in Chile on Sunday 13 December 2009 to elect the president, all 120 members of the Chamber of Deputies and 18 of the 38 members of the Senate were up for election. As no presidential candidate received a majority of the vote, a second round was held between the top two candidates — Sebastián Piñera and Eduardo Frei Ruiz-Tagle — on Sunday 17 January 2010. Piñera won the runoff with 52% of the vote and succeeded Michelle Bachelet on 11 March 2010.

In the Congressional elections, the centre-right Coalition for Change improved on the Alliance for Chile's result in 2005 by winning 58 seats in the Chamber of Deputies, while the governing center-left Concertación (CPD) was reduced to 57 seats. Three communist MPs were elected (Guillermo Teillier, Hugo Gutiérrez and Lautaro Carmona), while incumbent Speaker of the Chamber ,Rodrigo Álvarez (UDI) was defeated by Marcela Sabat (RN).

Background
Chilean politics is dominated by two main coalitions: the center-left Concert of Parties for Democracy (Concertación de Partidos por la Democracia), composed of the Christian Democrat Party, the Socialist Party, the Party for Democracy, and the Social Democrat Radical Party; and the center-right Alliance for Chile (Alianza por Chile), composed of the Independent Democratic Union and National Renewal. The Concertación selected former president Eduardo Frei Ruiz-Tagle as their candidate, while the Alianza chose former presidential candidate Sebastián Piñera, who is supported by the newly created Coalition for Change electoral group. The far-left Juntos Podemos Más pact selected former Socialist Party member Jorge Arrate as its candidate. Another former Socialist party member, deputy Marco Enríquez-Ominami (MEO), ran as independent.

Presidential candidates

Coalition for Change candidate

Party pre-candidates

Concertación candidate

Party pre-candidates

Each Concertación party selected its own pre-candidate for president. Only Frei and Gómez submitted their candidacies before the January 26, 2009 deadline.

Primary results

The primary was carried out on April 5, 2009 in the Maule and O'Higgins regions. Frei became the single Concertación candidate by beating Gómez by a 20-point lead, cancelling the need for further regional primaries.

Final results.

Juntos Podemos candidate

Party pre-candidates
{| class="wikitable"
|-
! Party !! Candidate !! Remarks
|- valign="top"
| style="text-align:center;"| PCCh
| style="text-align:center;"| Guillermo Teillier
| Teillier launched his candidacy on September 26, 2008. He said he is willing to step down in order to put forward a single candidate for the Juntos Podemos coalition of left-parties. In November 2008 he said he would be willing to participate in a primary between him, Hirsch and Alejandro Navarro, who had quit the Socialist Party. Teillier stepped down as Juntos Podemos pre-candidate on April 25, 2009, giving his support to Jorge Arrate, saying he was the right person according to the country's political moment.
|- valign="top"
| style="text-align:center;"| PH
| style="text-align:center;"| Tomás Hirsch
| Hirsch was among the founders of the Humanist Party and vied unsuccessfully for seats in the Chamber of Deputies as part of the Concertación. In 1993, the PH broke off from the coalition. In 1999 he was the Humanist presidential candidate, but lost in the first round. In 2005, he again participated in the presidential campaign, now with the additional support of the communists. He garnered a little over 5% of the vote. In an interview with Biobío Radio on September 1, 2007, Hirsch criticized the Concertación and the Alianza and declared that he would he "happy to be a candidate" if the members of his coalition agree. On June 7, 2008 he announced he intended to run for the presidency for the third time as the PH candidate, under the Juntos Podemos umbrella.
|- valign="top"
| style="text-align:center;"| Independent (Socialista-allendista)
| style="text-align:center;"| Jorge Arrate
| Arrate is a member of the more leftist faction of the PS and had been mentioned as a potential candidate in an alliance of this faction and the Juntos Podemos Más pact. He formally announced his candidacy on January 27, 2008, pressured by a group of socialists opposed to the Socialist Party leadership. On November 20, 2008, Arrate was proclaimed as candidate by a group of Socialist Party Central Committee members. Arrate resigned from the PS on January 14, 2009. He was proclaimed as presidential candidate on January 18, 2009 by a group of Socialist Party members, the so-called "socialistas-allendistas.
|}

Primary results

The election to define the sole Juntos Podemos candidate was carried out on April 25, 2009 in Santiago. Arrate beat Hirsch and became the single Juntos Podemos candidate.Final results.Independent candidate

Unsuccessful candidacies

Eduardo Artés (PC (AP)): He was proclaimed as a Juntos Podemos Más pre-candidate by the Communist Party (Proletarian Action) on December 7, 2007. However, on July 26, 2008, the PC (AP) left the Juntos Podemos Más pact, accusing them of abandoning their founding principles in light of the pact's electoral deal with the Concertación for the upcoming October municipal elections. He quit his candidacy in July 2009. He said his candidacy was just an opportunity to present new ideas to the country, as going through with the candidacy would be too economically onerous.
Leonardo Farkas (Ind.): A mining businessman. On December 5, 2008, he announced he was giving up his presidential candidacy.
Pamela Jiles (Ind.): Journalist and television presenter. She announced her candidacy in February 2009 through a column in The Clinic magazine. On September 4, 2009 she stepped out of the race in support of Navarro. In the same election, she unsuccessfully ran for a seat in the lower chamber of Congress.
Luis Molina Vega (Ind.) A civil engineer from Tomé. Molina stepped out of the race in July 2009, due to low support.
Alejandro Navarro (MAS): Navarro used to characterize himself as a leader in the "dissident" faction of the Socialist Party, which harshly criticized what they called the "neoliberal" economic model, supporting instead Hugo Chávez and Fidel Castro. Despite his involvement in a scandal due to his participation in a protest organized by the Unitary Workers Central where he attacked a policeman, with the possibility of being expelled from the Senate being considered, Navarro declared himself to be a presidential candidate in 2008. In November 2008, he quit the Socialist Party to form a new party called Broad Social Movement (MAS). He said his candidacy was necessary to "stop Piñera from winning in the first round", and still considered himself a Socialist. The MAS party proclaimed him its candidate on November 11, 2008; the party, however, was still open to stage a primary between all leftist candidates that were not part of the Concertación. Navarro has proposed to hold the primary in April 2009. On May 5, 2009 Navarro said he would step out of the race and support Arrate if polls released from then to September show the Juntos Podemos Más candidate having an advantage of seven points over him. He didn't rule out Arrate then supporting Enríquez-Ominami, if his candidacy was the strongest. Navarro was proclaimed as the official MAS candidate on July 25, 2009 with the support of other minor left groups. He submitted his candidacy to the Electoral Service on September 14, 2009. On September 22, 2009 Navarro withdrew his candidacy and gave his support to Enríquez-Ominami.
Adolfo Zaldívar (PRI): The former president of the Christian Democratic Party and a Senator at the time of his nomination, lost the last internal PDC primary to Alvear. He is the brother of senator and former Interior Minister Andrés Zaldívar. He was expelled from the PDC in December 2007, later becoming part of the Regionalist Party of the Independents (PRI). He announced his intention to run as president representing that party, and was proclaimed so on April 26, 2009. This decision was ratified on August 29, 2009. He stepped out of the race on September 14, 2009, just hours before the deadline for submission.

Coalitions for the Congressional elections
Concertación and Juntos Podemos Más

The A list conformed after the union of two political coalitions that had taken part separately in the elections of 2005. On one hand the Concertación, which was grouping to the center-left parties that since 1990 governed the country. In the other hand the left-wing Juntos Podemos Más, that it suffered an internal division after the exit of the Humanist Party.

The reason of this strange union was, the Binomial System that get out the political left from the National Congress since 1994.

The largest party inside the A list was the Christian Democrats, with the leadership of Juan Carlos Latorre who was chief of the Eduardo Frei's presidential campaign. The Socialists joined with the senator Camilo Escalona, PPD with the deputy Pepe Auth. The Radicals led by Senator Gómez, and the Communist Party with the leadership of Guillermo Teillier.

Coalition for Change

The Alliance for Chile for the elections of 2009, began with an important step, by means of I arrive of two precandidates, one of them the senator Pablo Longueira, and the mayor of Concepción, Jacqueline van Rysselberghe, both of the Independent Democratic Union, who demonstrated his availability of postulating to this post, using the regular conduits inside the coalition, nevertheless, both rejected such an option to present only a presidential candidate, who would be Sebastián Piñera.

In March, 2009, two Congressmen of the Alliance for Chile obtained the speaker of the Senate and the speaker of the Deputies' Chamber, by means of an agreement with the independent bench and with the Concert, respectively. The above mentioned agreements were not lacking in polemic, since the Senator who postulated the alliance to preside at the above mentioned organism, Jovino Novoa, was harshly criticized for personeros of the Concert in view of his past as member of Augusto Pinochet Ugarte's military regime.

In spite of the critiques, the Alliance for Chile awarded a political victory on having presided at both chambers of the National Congress and some of the most influential commissions of the same one, which, they waited in the conglomerate opponent, he was benefiting Sebastián Piñera's candidacy.

After having integrated the list Clean Chile, Vote Happy, one was generated fail between the charter members of ChileFirst with regard to the position that would take the party opposite to the presidential and parliamentary elections of 2009. Whereas Jorge Schaulsohn and Senator Flores supported the candidate of the Alliance for Chile Sebastián Piñera, the deputy Esteban Valenzuela rejected to join with the center-right and resigned ChileFirst to endorse Marco Enríquez-Ominami's candidacy. The support to Piñera on the part of ChileFirst was made official on May 6, 2009, when one presented the "Coalition for the Change", electoral agreement between the Alliance for Chile, ChileFirst and other political minor movements.

New Majority for Chile
New Majority for Chile was a political coalition that grouped the Ecologist party of Chile, the Humanist Party of Chile, and diverse political and independent movements that supported the candidacy of the independent Marco Enríquez-Ominami for the presidential election of 2009. Between the movements and groups without political legal constitution that they it shaped are the Regionalist Movement, the Movement Unified of Sexual Minorities (MUMS), the Movement SurDA and the Progressist Network.

Slogans

Opinion polls
Presidential election
List of opinion polls released within a year of the election. Only responses from persons registered to vote are shown.

First-round scenarios

DK/NR: Don't know / No response.

Runoff scenarios

Frei vs. Piñera

DK/NR: Don't know / No response.

Enríquez-Ominami vs. Piñera

DK/NR: Don't know / No response.

Arrate vs. Piñera

DK/NR: Don't know / No response.

Enríquez-Ominami vs. Frei

DK/NR: Don't know / No response.

Debates

The first debate was organized by TVN and took place in Studio #9 at the station's main headquarters in Santiago. It was broadcast live on September 23, 2009 at 10:40 p.m and included all four candidates. A poll published by Ipsos the following day, showed that Enríquez-Ominami, Arrate and Piñera were each considered to have had the best performance over the rest, with 29-30% of support, while Frei's showing only had the support of 9%. Frei was seen by 45% as the worst performer, followed by Piñera (37%), Arrate (10%) and Enríquez-Ominami (5%). Another poll by La Segunda found 23% thought Piñera had won the debate, followed by Arrate (21%), Enríquez-Ominami (15%) and Frei (9%). 31% thought none had won the debate.

The second debate was organized by Archi (Radio Broadcasters Association) and Mayor University. It took place at 8:30 AM on October 9, 2009. It was a radio-only debate, though some local 24-hour news channels broadcast live some parts of it. A poll carried out by Mayor University showed Piñera had won the debate by 41%, followed by Enríquez-Ominami (22%), Arrate (19%) and Frei Ruiz-Tagle (17%).

There was an online debate on November 4, organized by Terra and Radio Cooperativa. Only Arrate was present after the other three candidates declined to attend. Frei and Piñera had confirmed their presence in May, while Enríquez-Ominami backed down on the same day of the debate.

A debate to discuss regional issues took place on November 6 at 9 AM in Talca's casino. It was organized by the National Press Association (ANP) and was attended by all four candidates.

A fifth debate took place on November 9 at Canal 13's studios in Santiago, which was broadcast live at 10 PM. All four candidates were present. This debate was notable because the candidates were able to ask questions to one another and freely talk to each other.

The last debate of the first round was organized by the National Television Association (Anatel) and broadcast live on November 16 at 10 PM by all terrestrial television stations. All candidates attended. There was no audience present.

For the second round, there was a single debate between the two candidates. It was organized by Anatel and broadcast at 10 PM by all terrestrial television stations on January 11, 2010.

Results
President
On December 20, 2009, the Juntos Podemos Más coalition gave his support to Eduardo Frei's candidacy, after the former president agreed to include a number of policies into his government program. Two days later, Jorge Arrate also gave his full support to Frei. On January 13, 2010 Enríquez-Ominami held a press conference to state he would vote for Frei, although he did not say his name. He had previously said that voting for Piñera would be a regression and voting for Frei would not be an advancement.

Chamber of Deputies

List of elected deputies 2010–2014

Senate

Tarapacá-Arica and Parinacota

!colspan=2|Pact
!colspan=2|Party
!Candidate
!Votes
!%
!Result
|-
| 
| 
|Jaime Orpis
|56,390
|33.5
|
|-
| 
| 
|Salvador Urrutia
|47,087
|29.3
|
|-
| 
| 
|Fulvio Rossi
|45,639
|26.8
|
|-
| 
| 
|Julio Lagos
|12,348
|7.3
|
|-
| 
| 
|Daniel Espinoza
|6,919
|4.1
|
|}

Atacama

!colspan=2|Pact
!colspan=2|Party
!Candidate
!Votes
!%
!Result
|-
| 
| 
|Baldo Prokurica
|34,793	||33.0
|
|-
| 
| 
|Isabel Allende Bussi
|28,240	 ||26.8
|
|-
| 
| 
|Antonio Leal
|19,693	 ||18.7
|
|-
| 
| 
|Jaime Mulet Martínez
|18,580	 ||17.6	
|
|-
| 
| 
|Robinson Peña
|2,126	 ||2.0
|
|-
| 
| 
|Cristián Letelier
|1,909	 ||1.8
|
|}

Valparaiso East

!colspan=2|Pact
!colspan=2|Party
!Candidate
!Votes
!%
!Result
|-
| 
| 
|Ignacio Walker
|76,716 ||21.1
|
|-
| 
| 
|Nelson Ávila
|64,124 ||17.6
|
|-
| 
| 
|Marcelo Forni
|71,645 ||19.7
|
|-
| 
| 
|Lily Pérez
|83,595 ||23.0
|
|-
|bgcolor=red| ||align=left|New Majority for Chile
| 
|Carlos Ominami
|60,945 ||16.7
|
|-
|bgcolor=red| ||align=left|New Majority for Chile
| 
|Cristián García-Huidobro
|2,509 ||0.7
|
|-
| 
| 
|Lautaro Velásquez
|4,422 ||1.2
|
|}

Valparaíso West

!colspan=2|Pact
!colspan=2|Party
!Candidate
!Votes
!%
!Result
|-
| 
| 
|Ricardo Lagos Weber
|123,626 ||33.2
|
|-
| 
| 
|Francisco Chahuán
|105,123 ||28.2
|
|-
| 
| 
|Joaquín Lavín
|103,762 ||27.9
|
|-
| 
| 
|Hernán Pinto
|22,447 ||6.00
|
|-
|bgcolor=red| ||align=left|New Majority for Chile
| 
|Juan Guzmán
|14,784  ||4.0
|
|-
| 
| 
|Raúl Silva
|2,773 	 ||0.7
|
|-
|}

Maule North

!colspan=2|Pact
!colspan=2|Party
!Candidate
!Votes
!%
!Result
|-
| 
| 
|Juan Antonio Coloma
|96,844 ||35.2
|
|-
| 
| 
|Andrés Zaldívar
|86,266 ||31.3
|
|-
| 
| 
|Jaime Gazmuri
|67,586 ||24.6
|
|-
| 
| 
|Robert Morrison
|17,548 ||6.3
|
|-
|bgcolor=red| ||align=left|New Majority for Chile
| 
|Mercedes Bravo
|6,942 ||2.5
|
|-
|}

Maule South

!colspan=2|Pact
!colspan=2|Party
!Candidate
!Votes
!%
!Result
|-
| 
| 
|Hernán Larraín
|67,461	||43.1
|
|-
| 
| 
|Ximena Rincón
|48,607	||31.0
|
|-
| 
| 
|Jaime Naranjo
|32,867	||21.0
|
|-
| 
| 
|Juan Ariztía
|6,110	||3.9
|
|-
|bgcolor=red| ||align=left|New Majority for Chile
| 
|Marilén Cabrera
|1,567	||1.0
|
|-
|}

Araucanía North

!colspan=2|Pact
!colspan=2|Party
!Candidate
!Votes
!%
!Result
|-
| 
| 
|Alberto Espina
|52,082 ||38.5
|
|-
| 
| 
|Jaime Quintana
|40,120 ||29.7
|
|-
| 
| 
|Tomás Jocelyn-Holt
|7,481 ||5.5
|
|-
| 
| 
|Cecilia Villouta
|7,255 ||5.4
|
|-
|bgcolor=red| ||align=left|New Majority for Chile
| 
|Juan Enrique Prieto
|1,611 ||1.2
|
|-
| 
| 
|Roberto Muñoz
|20,126 ||14.9
|
|-
| 
| 
|Enrique Sanhueza
|6,574 ||4.9
|
|-
|colspan=6|Source
|}

Araucanía South

!colspan=2|Pact
!colspan=2|Party
!Candidate
!Votes
!%
!Result
|-
| 
| 
|Eugenio Tuma Zedan
|74,207 ||29.1
|
|-
| 
| 
|José García Ruminot
|57,260 ||22.4
|
|-
| 
| 
|Ena von Baer
|56,578 ||22.2
|
|-
| 
| 
|Francisco Huenchumilla
|51,338 ||20.1
|
|-
| 
| 
|Eduardo Díaz
|11,464 ||4.5
|
|-
|bgcolor=red| ||align=left|New Majority for Chile
| 
|Luis Fernando Vivanco
|2,779 ||1.1
|
|-
| 
| 
|José Villagrán
|1,512 ||0.6
|
|-
|colspan=6|Source|}

Aysen

!colspan=2|Pact
!colspan=2|Party
!Candidate
!Votes
!%
!Result
|-
| 
| 
|Antonio Horvath
|14,193 ||34.6
|
|-
| 
| 
|Patricio Walker
|11,293 ||27.5
|
|-
| 
| 
|Eduardo Cruces
|6,958 ||17.0
|
|-
| 
| 
|Paz Foitzich
|4,613 ||11.2
|
|-
| 
| 
|Ernesto Velasco
|3,940 ||9.6
|
|-
|colspan=6|Source
|}

Timeline
September 13, 2009: Deadline to enroll to vote in the upcoming elections.
September 14, 2009: Deadline to register candidacies at the Electoral Service (Servel).
September 14, 2009: Electoral campaign begins.
October 5, 2009: Draw supervised by Servel to assign a ballot number to each candidate.
November 13, 2009: Electoral advertisement period starts.
December 10, 2009: Electoral advertisement period ends.
December 13, 2009: Election day. Electoral campaigning ends.
December 13, 2009: First preliminary results are announced by the Deputy Interior Minister at 6:30 p.m. local time (9:30 p.m. UTC), including 4,342 out of 34,348 ballot boxes (12.64%).
December 13, 2009: Second preliminary results are announced by the Deputy Interior Minister at 8:03 p.m. local time (11:03 p.m. UTC), including 20,595 ballot boxes (59.96%).
December 13, 2009: Third preliminary results are announced by the Deputy Interior Minister at 10:56 p.m. local time (1:56 a.m. UTC), including 33,756 ballot boxes (98.28%).
December 14, 2009: Fourth and final preliminary results are announced by the Deputy Interior Minister at 11:05 a.m. local time (2:05 p.m. UTC), including 34,133 ballot boxes (99.37%).
December 21, 2009: The Electoral Service (Servel) publishes preliminary results based on the examination of election certificates (actas de escrutinio) by the Tellers' Colleges (Colegios Escrutadores'') meeting on December 14, 2009, including 34,263 out of 34,348 ballot boxes (99.75%).
December 29, 2009: The Tricel publishes the final results of the first round election on the Official Gazette.
January 3, 2009: Electoral advertisement period for runoff election starts.
January 7, 2009: Ballot number is assigned to each candidate according to their position in the first draw.
January 14, 2009: Electoral advertisement period ends.
January 17, 2010: Date of presidential run-off. Electoral campaigning ends.
January 17, 2010: First preliminary results are announced by the Deputy Interior Ministry at 6:00 p.m. local time (9:00 p.m. UTC), including results from 20,711 out of 34,348 ballot boxes (60.30%).
January 17, 2010: Eduardo Frei concedes the election to Sebastián Piñera at 6:44 p.m. local time (9:44 p.m. UTC).
January 17, 2010: Second preliminary results are announced by the Deputy Interior Ministry at 7:40 p.m. local time (10:40 p.m. UTC), including results from 34,056 ballot boxes (99.15%).
January 18, 2010: Third and final preliminary results are announced by the Deputy Interior Ministry at 11:00 a.m. local time (2:00 p.m. UTC), including results from 34,252 ballot boxes (99.72%).
January 29, 2010: The Election Qualifying Court (Tricel) officially proclaims PIñera as President-elect.
January 30, 2010: The Tricel publishes the Act of Proclamation on the Official Gazette.
February 3, 2010: The Tricel publishes the final results of the runoff election on its website.

References

External links
Results down to communal level (Interior Ministry)
Results from Election Counting Colleges (Electoral Service)
Results by ballot box (Election Qualifying Court)

General
Chile
Presidential elections in Chile
Elections in Chile
2009 in Chile
2010 in Chile
General
Chile
Chile
Chile